Mohammed Ebrahim Hajeyah is a retired Kuwaiti football player. Ibrahem played for Kuwaiti football club Al Qadisiya (Qadsia Sporting Club) in the Gulf Club Champions Cup, Kuwaiti Premier League, Crown Prince Cup and the Kharafi Cup, and for the Kuwait national football team. He was head coach of the Kuwait national football team until 2009 when he stepped down and was replaced by Goran Tufegdžić.

Coaching record

Qadsia 
Kuwait Premier League: 2008–09, 2009–10, 2010–11, 2013–14
Kuwait Emir Cup: 2007, 2010, 2011–12, 2013
Kuwait Crown Prince Cup: 2006, 2009, 2012–13, 2013–14
Kuwait Super Cup: 2009, 2011, 2014

References

External links

Profile at Soccerpunter.com

1962 births
Living people
Kuwaiti footballers
Qadsia SC players
Kuwaiti football managers
Kuwait Premier League managers
Qadsia SC managers
2004 AFC Asian Cup managers
Kuwait national football team managers
Al-Arabi SC (Kuwait) managers
Association footballers not categorized by position
Al-Salmiya SC managers
Kuwait SC managers